William Joseph Pecota (born February 16, 1960) is a former Major League Baseball infielder. He is the namesake of PECOTA, a sabermetric created by Nate Silver and owned by Baseball Prospectus.

Early years
Pecota attended Peterson High School in Sunnyvale, California. He was drafted by the Kansas City Royals in the tenth round of the  January draft after playing at De Anza College in Cupertino, California. He batted .253 with 31 home runs and 267 runs batted in over six seasons in the Royals' farm system when he debuted with the Royals in September .

Kansas City Royals
Pecota accomplished the rare feat of getting his first major league RBI before his first major league hit. On September 22, in his sixth plate appearance, he drove in Jim Sundberg with a sacrifice fly. On September 25, he doubled off Frank Viola for his first major league hit.

He started the  season with the Omaha Royals but was up in the majors by the end of April. He went back-to-back with Bo Jackson on May 8 for his first major league home run. Despite going 4-for-4 in the last game of his three-week stint in the majors to raise his season average to .556, Pecota was optioned back to triple A in mid-May. He was immediately recalled when third baseman George Brett went on the disabled list. He made a third trip to Omaha in late June, prompting the nickname "I-29" by his teammates, as Omaha is a short drive up Interstate 29 from Kansas City. Overall, he batted .276 with three home runs, fourteen RBIs and 22 runs scored backing up second, third and shortstop for the Royals. At the other end of I-29, he batted .310 with two home runs and sixteen RBIs.

Despite spending most of the  season with a below .200 batting average, Pecota spent the entire season in the majors, thanks to his ability to play multiple positions well. He made debuts at first and both corner outfield positions, and actually caught an inning. A modest nine game hitting streak in late August brought his average over .200.

Pecota once again spent the  season going back and forth up I-29. He made his debut in centerfield, leaving pitcher as the only position on the field he never played. In the first game of a July 19 doubleheader with the New York Yankees, Pecota had his only career two home run game. He homered again in the second game, accounting for all three home runs he would hit for the season, and four of his five RBIs.

Pecota appeared in three games as a defensive replacement before he was optioned back to Omaha to start the  season. He was recalled in early June and had only logged three at bats when he had a 4-for-4 game against the California Angels. His hot hitting continued through the month of June, and with Royals legend Frank White in the final season of his eighteen-year career, Pecota began seeing more playing time at second base. For the season, he batted .242 with five home runs and twenty RBIs.

Pecota saw limited playing time in  until an injury to Kevin Seitzer thrust him into the starting third base job. He batted .253 with two home runs and thirteen RBIs filling in for Seitzer. Upon Setzer's return in late May, Pecota returned to his back-up role. This backup role included a relief appearance, adding Pecota to the list of big leaguers to play all nine positions plus designated hitter at one time or another during his bi- league career. In early July, manager Hal McRae decided to replace Seitzer at third with Pecota permanently. The Royals were 35-44 and in last place in the American League West at the time of the change. They went 47-36 the rest of the way to finish the season in second place. For his part, Pecota batted .286 with a career best six home runs and 45 RBIs in a career-high 125 games.

New York Mets
At the Winter meetings, he was part of a blockbuster deal in which he and two-time Cy Young Award winner Bret Saberhagen were traded to the New York Mets for Gregg Jefferies, Kevin McReynolds and Keith Miller.

Pecota's versatility came in handy with his new franchise as well, as he appeared in 117 games backing up all four infield positions. He also pitched an inning for the Mets, making him the first position player to pitch in franchise history.

The 1992 Mets were a disappointment that lost 90 games. After one season with the team dubbed "The worst team money could buy," Pecota signed as a free agent with the Atlanta Braves.

Atlanta Braves
In 65 plate appearances, Pecota batted .323 for the 104-win Braves. Backing up Mark Lemke, Terry Pendleton and David Justice, Pecota logged 80.2 innings on the field without committing an error. He reached the post season for the only time in his career. In the 1993 National League Championship Series against the Philadelphia Phillies, Pecota went 1-for-3 with a run scored in game one.

In , Pecota saw most of his playing time at third base, though he almost earned a third opportunity to pitch. In a fifteeninning marathon with the Phillies, manager Bobby Cox had used all of his position players. Had the game gone on to a sixteenth inning, his intention was to use starting pitcher John Smoltz in left field and have Pecota pitch. Instead, relief pitcher Mike Stanton successfully bunted Deion Sanders home from third with the winning run to end the game. They were 68-46, six games back in the National League East when the player strike ended the season and ended Pecota's chance of making the post season a second time.

Career statistics

See also
PECOTA, the Baseball Prospectus forecasting system named after Pecota.

References

External links
, or The Ultimate Mets Database

1960 births
Living people
De Anza Dons baseball players
Major League Baseball infielders
New York Mets players
Atlanta Braves players
Kansas City Royals players
People from Redwood City, California
People from Sunnyvale, California
Fort Myers Royals players
Gulf Coast Royals players
Jacksonville Suns players
Memphis Chicks players
Omaha Royals players